Kalvøya is situated in the inner Oslofjord. The island is right outside of Sandvika in Bærum. The island has been connected to the mainland by a suspension bridge to Kadettangen since 1963.

Kalvøya is one of the most popular bathing spots in Bærum. On the far east side of the island there is a nude beach.

Kalvøya plays host to an annual soccer tournament for kids and a children's festival. The festival Øyafestivalen also has its roots there.

There was an annual music festival (Kalvøyafestivalen) on the island where several international performers have played live over the years including Billy Idol, Iggy Pop, Leonard Cohen, Morten Abel, and The September When.

Islands of Viken (county)
Bærum